Turieno is a town in the municipality of Camaleño (Cantabria, Spain).

References
 

Municipalities of Spain